Mark Steven Sandy is an American career official with the U.S. federal government. He served as acting director of the Office of Management and Budget (OMB) from January 20 to February 16, 2017.  , he was the Deputy Associate Director for National Security Programs at OMB.

Early life and education
Sandy grew up in Greater Deyerle, Roanoke, Virginia, the youngest of three children. He completed high school at North Cross School in Roanoke, Virginia, graduating with the class of 1984 as valedictorian, having served as class president and chairman of the North Cross Honor Council. The school bestowed on him with Thomas Slack Award, named after a former headmaster, and awarded for "citizenship and strength of character."

At Davidson College, Sandy earned a bachelor's in politics and economics in 1987 and was president of the student government association. He went on to earn a second bachelor's in philosophy, politics and economics at the University of Oxford on a Marshall Scholarship that he'd won in 1985. He then earned a Master of Public Administration from the Woodrow Wilson School of Public and International Affairs at Princeton University in 1991 on a Truman Scholarship. After graduating, he was nominated for a Henry Luce Scholarship for a placement at the Institute for International Policy Studies in Tokyo from 1991 to 1992.

Career

Sandy is a career official with the U.S. federal government. He has served under both Republican and Democratic administrations. By 2019 he had become a senior career official at the Office of Management and Budget, senior enough so that he served as acting director early in the Trump administration, before political appointees were hired. In testifying during the impeachment inquiry, Sandy became the first OMB official to meet with investigators after higher ranking political appointees fought subpoenas and refused to provide requested documents.

Sandy was signatory on at least one "apportionment letter" that delayed the release of military aid to Ukraine in 2019. On November 16, 2019, he testified in a deposition that Trump did in fact enact an unusual freeze in aid to Ukraine.

See also 
Trump–Ukraine scandal
Impeachment inquiry against Donald Trump

References 

Directors of the Office of Management and Budget
Living people
Princeton University alumni
Trump administration cabinet members
Year of birth missing (living people)